Columbia Hills Corners is an unincorporated community in Lorain County, in the U.S. state of Ohio.

History
An early variant name was Copopa. A post office called Copopa was established in 1824, and remained in operation until 1904. The euphonic name of Columbia Hills Corners was coined by a property developer in order to generate interest in his new country club near the town site.

References

Unincorporated communities in Lorain County, Ohio
Unincorporated communities in Ohio